Though the terms sex and gender have been used interchangeably since at least the fourteenth century, in contemporary academic literature they usually have distinct meanings. Sex generally refers to an organism's biological sex, while gender usually refers to either social roles based on the sex of a person (gender role) or personal identification of one's own gender based on an internal awareness (gender identity). While in ordinary speech, the terms sex and gender are often used interchangeably, most contemporary social scientists, behavioral scientists and biologists, many legal systems and government bodies, and intergovernmental agencies such as the WHO make a distinction between gender and sex.

In most individuals, the various biological determinants of sex are congruent, and consistent with the individual's gender identity, but in some circumstances, an individual's assigned sex and gender do not align, and the person may be transgender. Also in some cases, an individual may have sex characteristics that complicate sex assignment, and the person may be intersex.

Sexologist John Money is often regarded as the first to introduce a distinction between biological sex and gender identity in 1955, although Madison Bentley had already defined gender as the "socialized obverse of sex" a decade earlier. As originally conceived by Money, gender and sex are analysed together as a single category including both biological and social elements, but later work by Robert Stoller separated the two, designating sex and gender as biological and cultural categories, respectively. Before the work of Bentley, Money and Stoller, the word gender was only regularly used to refer to grammatical categories.

Sex

Biologists 
Anisogamy, or the size differences of gametes (sex cells), is the defining feature of the two sexes. According to biologist Michael Majerus there is no other universal difference between males and females.

By definition, males are organisms that produce small, mobile gametes (sperm); while females are organisms that produce large and generally immobile gametes (ova or eggs). Richard Dawkins stated that it is possible to interpret all the differences between the sexes as stemming from this single difference in gametes.

Bhargava et al. (2021) note that the terms sex and gender are not, and should not be used as, interchangeable terms. They state that "[s]ex is dichotomous, with sex determination in the fertilized zygote stemming from unequal expression of sex chromosomal genes." In contrast, gender is seen as including "perception of the individual as male, female, or other, both by the individual and by society". The authors differentiate between sex differences, caused by biological factors, and gender differences, which "reflect a complex interplay of psychological, environmental, cultural, and biological factors". Gender identity is thus seen as a "psychological concept that refers to an individual's self-perception".

Other studies have noted that, while there is some tentative evidence for a potential genetic, neuroanatomical, and hormonal basis for gender identity, the specific biological mechanisms involved have not yet been demonstrated.

Sex differences 

The term sex differences is typically applied to sexually dimorphic traits that are hypothesized to be evolved consequences of sexual selection. For example, the human "sex difference" in height is a consequence of sexual selection, while the "gender difference" typically seen in head hair length (women with longer hair) is not. Scientific research shows an individual's sex influences his or her behavior.

Sex differences are primarily caused by hormonal, genetic, and environmental factors. According to David Geary, the most fundamental sex difference in humans is the respective cost of reproduction, which is higher for females than males because of pregnancy and higher postnatal parental expenditure, resulting in different mating choice preferences for males and females.

Psychiatrists 
Robert Stoller, whose work was the first to treat sex and gender as "two different orders of data", in his book Sex and Gender: The Development of Masculinity and Femininity, uses the term 'sex' to refer to the "male or the female sex and the component biological parts that determine whether one is a male or a female". He further states that, in order to determine sex, chromosomes, external genitalia, internal genitalia, gonads, hormonal states, secondary sex characteristics, and possibly also brain systems, must be analysed. He states that a person's sex is determined by "an algebraic sum of all these qualities", resulting in most people being classified as either 'male' or 'female'.

The American Psychiatric Association states that sex is often described as a biological construct, "defined on an anatomical, hormonal, or genetic basis", and assigned at birth based on external genitalia.

Psychologists 
In The Psychology of Gender, it is stated that "sex refers to the biological categories of female and male, categories distinguished by genes, chromosomes, and hormones." One of the (context dependant) guidelines used by the American Psychological Association states that "[t]here are a number of indicators of biological sex, including sex chromosomes, gonads, internal reproductive organs, and external genitalia."

Sociologists 
Sociologist Dudley Poston states that sex in humans is "determined biologically, in five ways":

Based on different chromosomes.
Based on different gonads, which produce the gametes and sex hormones.
Based on different relative levels of sex-specific hormones.
Based on different internal reproductive structures.
Based on different sex-specific external genitals. This definition usually results in the assignment of sex at birth.

According to Poston, "[s]ex refers mainly to biological characteristics, while gender refers mainly to sociological characteristics."

While noting that typically sex is assigned based on genital inspection at birth, Raine Dozier states that biological sex is "a complex constellation of chromosomes, hormones, genitalia, and reproductive organs."

Feminist theorists 
In The Oxford Handbook of Feminist Theory, Mary Hawkesworth and Lisa Disch note that feminist theorists have criticised the biological basis of sexual dimorphism. These theorists claim to have demonstrated that there are more than two naturally occurring sexes, and that, whether defined in terms of chromosomes, hormones, gonads, internal morphology, external genitalia, or secondary sex characteristics, "none of the typical correlates of biological sex conform to the demands of dichotomous classification", and that all these characteristics "fail to differentiate all men from all women or to provide a common core within each sex."

Dictionaries 
Sex is annotated as different from gender in the Oxford English Dictionary, where it says sex "tends now to refer to biological differences, while gender often refers to cultural or social ones."

Merriam-Webster defines sex as “either of the two major forms of individuals that occur in many species and that are distinguished respectively as female or male especially on the basis of their reproductive organs and structures.” or "the sum of the structural, functional, and sometimes behavioral characteristics of organisms that distinguish males and females". They also note that "[d]octors can alter the physical characteristics of sex, but bodily sex does not determine gender."

Public health organizations
The World Health Organization (WHO) similarly states that "'sex' refers to the biological and physiological characteristics that define men and women" and that "'male' and 'female' are sex categories". According to the CDC people whose internal psychological experience differs from their assigned sex are transgender, transsexual, or non-binary.

History 
Historian Thomas W. Laqueur suggests that from the Renaissance to the 18th century, there was a prevailing inclination among doctors towards the existence of only one biological sex (the one-sex theory, that women and men had the same fundamental reproductive structure). In some discourses, this view persisted into the eighteenth and nineteenth centuries. Laqueur asserts that even at its peak, the one-sex model was supported among highly educated Europeans but is not known to have been a popular view nor one entirely agreed upon by doctors who treated the general population.

Scholars such as Joan Cadden and Michael Stolberg have criticized Laqueur's theory. Stolberg provides evidence to suggest that significant two-sex understandings of anatomy existed before Laqueur claims, arguing that sexual dimorphism was accepted as early as the sixteenth century. Joan Cadden has stated that 'one-sex' models of the body were already treated with scepticism in the ancient and medieval periods, and that Laqueur's periodisation of the shift from one-sex to two-sex was not as clear-cut as he made it out to be.

Sex and gender took center stage in America in the time of wars, when women had to work and men were at war.

Gender

Dictionaries 
In the Oxford English Dictionary, gender is defined as—in a modern and especially feminist use—"a euphemism for the sex of a human being, often intended to emphasize the social and cultural, as opposed to the biological, distinctions between the sexes", with the earliest example cited being from 1963. The American Heritage Dictionary (5th edition) states that gender may be defined by identity as "neither entirely female nor entirely male"; its Usage Note adds:
Some people maintain that the word sex should be reserved for reference to the biological aspects of being male or female or to sexual activity, and that the word gender should be used only to refer to sociocultural roles. ... In some situations this distinction avoids ambiguity, as in gender research, which is clear in a way that sex research is not. The distinction can be problematic, however. Linguistically, there isn't any real difference between gender bias and sex bias, and it may seem contrived to insist that sex is incorrect in this instance.

Public medical organizations 
A working definition in use by the World Health Organization for its work is that "'[g]ender' refers to the socially constructed roles, behaviours, activities, and attributes that a given society considers appropriate for men and women" and that "'masculine' and 'feminine' are gender categories." The Food and Drug Administration (FDA) used to use gender instead of sex when referring to physiological differences between male and female organisms. In 2011, they reversed their position on this and began using sex as the biological classification and gender as "a person's self representation as male or female, or how that person is responded to by social institutions based on the individual's gender presentation." Gender is also now commonly used even to refer to the physiology of non-human animals, without any implication of social gender roles.

Political organizations 
GLAAD (formerly the Gay & Lesbian Alliance Against Defamation) makes a distinction between sex and gender. In their Media Reference Guide for transgender issues, they describe sex as "the classification of people as male or female" at birth, based on bodily characteristics such as chromosomes, hormones, internal reproductive organs, and genitalia, and gender identity as "a person's internal, deeply held sense of their gender".
A Comprehensive Grammar of the English Language, for instance, states  Thus German, for instance, has three genders: masculine, feminine, and neuter. Nouns referring to people and animals of known sex are generally  referred to by nouns with the equivalent gender. Thus Mann (meaning man) is masculine and is associated with a masculine definite article to give der Mann, while Frau (meaning woman) is feminine and is associated with a feminine definite article to give die Frau. However the words for inanimate objects are commonly masculine (e.g. der Tisch, the table) or feminine (die Armbanduhr, the watch), and grammatical gender can diverge from biological sex; for instance the feminine noun [die] Person refers to a person of either sex, and the neuter noun [das] Mädchen means "the girl".

In modern English, there is no true grammatical gender in this sense, though the differentiation, for instance, between the pronouns "he" and "she", which in English refers to a difference in sex (or social gender), is sometimes referred to as a gender distinction. A Comprehensive Grammar of the English Language, for instance, refers to the semantically based "covert" gender (e.g. male and female, not masculine and feminine) of English nouns, as opposed to the "overt" gender of some English pronouns; this yields nine gender classes: male, female, dual, common, collective, higher male animal, higher female animal, lower animal, and inanimate, and these semantic gender classes affect the possible choices of pronoun for coreference to the real-life entity, e.g. who and he for brother but which and it or she for cow.

West and Zimmerman's "Doing Gender"

Used primarily in sociology and gender studies, "doing gender" is the socially constructed performance which takes place during routine human interactions, rather than as a set of essentialized qualities based on one's biological sex. The term first appeared in Candace West and Don Zimmerman's article "Doing Gender", published in the peer-reviewed journal, Gender and Society. Originally written in 1977 but not published until 1987, "Doing Gender" is the most cited article published in Gender and Society.

West and Zimmerman state that to understand gender as activity, it is important to differentiate between sex, sex category, and gender. They say that sex refers to the socially agreed upon specifications that establish one as male or female; sex is most often based on an individual's genitalia, or even their chromosomal typing before birth. They consider sex categories to be dichotomous, and that the person is placed in a sex category by exhibiting qualities exclusive to one category or the other. During most interactions, others situate a person's sex by identifying their sex category; however, they believe that a person's sex need not align with their sex category. West and Zimmerman maintain that the sex category is "established and sustained by the socially required identificatory displays that proclaim one's membership in one or the other category". Gender is the performance of attitudes and actions that are considered socially acceptable for one's sex category.

West and Zimmerman suggested that the interactional process of doing gender, combined with socially agreed upon gender expectations, holds individuals accountable for their gender performances. They also believe that while "doing gender" appropriately strengthens and promotes social structures based on the gender dichotomy, it inappropriately does not call into question these same social structures; only the individual actor is questioned. The concept of "doing gender" recognizes that gender both structures human interactions and is created through them.

Criticism of the "sex difference" versus "gender difference" distinction 

The current distinction between the terms sex difference versus gender difference has been criticized as misleading and counterproductive. These terms suggest that the behavior of an individual can be partitioned into separate biological and cultural factors. (However, behavioral differences between individuals can be statistically partitioned, as studied by behavioral genetics.) Instead, all behaviors are phenotypes—a complex interweaving of both nature and nurture.

Some psychologists have argued that the distinction between the terms "sex" and "gender" should be abandoned. The term "gender/sex" has been proposed, to emphasise the inseparability of biological, sociological, and cultural factors.

Diane Halpern, in her book Sex Differences in Cognitive Abilities, argued problems with sex vs. gender terminology:I cannot argue (in this book) that nature and nurture are inseparable and then... use different terms to refer to each class of variables.  The ... biological manifestations of sex are confounded with psychosocial variables.... The use of different terms to label these two types of contributions to human existence seemed inappropriate in light of the biopsychosocial position I have taken.She quotes Steven Pinker's summary of the problems with the terms sex and gender: "Part of it is a new prissiness—many people today are as squeamish about sexual dimorphism as the Victorians were about sex. But part of it is a limitation of the English language. The word 'sex' refers ambiguously to copulation and to sexual dimorphism..." Richard Lippa writes in Gender, Nature and Nurture that:Some researchers have argued that the word sex should be used to refer to (biological differences), whereas the word gender should be used to refer to (cultural differences). However, it is not at all clear the degree to which the differences between males and females are due to biological factors versus learned and cultural factors. Furthermore, indiscriminate use of the word gender tends to obscure the distinction between two different topics: (a) differences between males and females, and (b) individual differences in maleness and femaleness that occur within each sex.It has been suggested that more useful distinctions to make would be whether a behavioral difference between the sexes is first due to an evolved adaptation, then, if so, whether the adaptation is sexually dimorphic (different) or sexually monomorphic (the same in both sexes). The term sex difference could then be re-defined as between-sex differences that are manifestations of a sexually dimorphic adaptation (which is how many scientists use the term), while the term gender difference could be re-defined as due to differential socialization between the sexes of a monomorphic adaptation or byproduct. For example, greater male propensity toward physical aggression and risk taking would be termed a "sex difference;" the generally longer head hair length of females would be termed a "gender difference".

Transgender and genderqueer 

Transgender people experience a mismatch between their gender identity or gender expression, and their assigned sex. Transgender people are sometimes called transsexual if they desire medical assistance to transition from one sex to another.

Transgender is also an umbrella term: in addition to including people whose gender identity is the opposite of their assigned sex (trans men and trans women), it may include people who are not exclusively masculine or feminine (e.g. people who are genderqueer, non-binary, bigender, pangender, genderfluid, or agender). Other definitions of transgender also include people who belong to a third gender, or conceptualize transgender people as a third gender. Infrequently, the term transgender is defined very broadly to include cross-dressers.

Feminism

General
Many feminists consider sex to only be a matter of biology and something that is not about social or cultural construction. For example, Lynda Birke, a feminist biologist, states that biology' is not seen as something which might change."  However, the sex/gender distinction, also known as the Standard Model of Sex/Gender, is criticized by feminists who believe that there is undue emphasis placed on sex being a biological aspect, something that is fixed, natural, unchanging, and consisting of a male/female dichotomy. They believe the distinction fails to recognize anything outside the strictly male/female dichotomy and that it creates a barrier between those that fit as 'usual' and those that are 'unusual'. In Anne Fausto-Sterling's Sexing the Body she addresses the birth of children who are intersex. In this case, the standard model (sex/gender distinction) is seen as incorrect with regard to its notion that there are only two sexes, male and female. This is because "complete maleness and complete femaleness represent the extreme ends of a spectrum of possible body types." In other words, Fausto-Sterling argues that sex is a continuum.

Rather than viewing sex as a biological construct, there are feminists who view both sex and gender as a social construct.   Fausto-Sterling believes that sex is socially constructed because nature does not decide on who is seen as a male or female physically. Rather, doctors decide what seems to be a "natural" sex for the inhabitants of society. In addition, the gender, behavior, actions, and appearance of males/females is also seen as socially constructed because codes of femininity and masculinity are chosen and deemed fit by society for societal usage.

Some feminist philosophers maintain that gender is totally undetermined by sex. See, for example, The Dialectic of Sex: The Case for Feminist Revolution, a widely influential feminist text.

Mari Mikkola has put forward the "Trait/Norm Covariance Model" as a suggested replacement for the sex/gender distinction. Arguing that the sex/gender distinction, as formulated in contemporary feminism, implies that "doing away with gender should be feminism's political goal", the model divides by descriptive traits and evaluative norms, rather than by sex and gender. In this model, the term "descriptive traits" includes physical and anatomical traits, roles, and self-conceptions. So for example, "sex traits" (such as having ovaries) and "gender traits" (such as wearing make-up) are both subsumed under the category of descriptive traits, whereas "being feminine" is taken as an evaluative norm. Evaluative norms reflect how descriptive traits are evaluated by external observers, and certain descriptive traits may covary with certain evaluative norms. So for example the trait "having long hair" covaries strongly with feminine norms in some cultures, and less so in others.

Limitations

Lorber
Some feminists go further and argue that neither sex nor gender are strictly binary concepts. Judith Lorber, for instance, has stated that many conventional indicators of sex are not sufficient to demarcate male from female. For example, not all women lactate, while some men do. Similarly, Suzanne Kessler, in a 1990 survey of medical specialists in pediatric intersexuality, found out that when a child was born with XY chromosomes but ambiguous genitalia, its sex was often determined according to the size of its penis. Thus, even if the sex/gender distinction holds, Lorber and Kessler suggest that the dichotomies of female/male and masculine/feminine are not themselves exhaustive. Lorber writes, "My perspective goes beyond accepted feminist views that gender is a cultural overlay that modifies physiological sex differences ... I am arguing that bodies differ in many ways physiologically, but they are completely transformed by social practices to fit into the salient categories of a society, the most pervasive of which are 'female' and 'male' and 'women' and 'men.'"

Moreover, Lorber has alleged that there exists more diversity within the individual categories of sex and gender—female/male and feminine/masculine, respectively—than between them. Hence, her fundamental claim is that both sex and gender are social constructions, rather than natural kinds.

Monique Wittig

A comparable view has been advanced by Linda M.G. Zerilli, who writes regarding Monique Wittig, that she is "critical of the sex/gender dichotomy in much feminist theory because such a dichotomy leaves unquestioned the belief that there is a 'core of nature which resists examination, a relationship excluded from the social in the analysis—a relationship whose characteristic is ineluctability in culture, as well as in nature, and which is the heterosexual relationship.'" Building off Wittig, Judith Butler also criticizes the sex/gender distinction. Discussing sex as biological fact causes sex to appear natural and politically neutral. However, she writes, "Are the ostensibly natural facts of sex discursively produced in the service of other political and social interests?" Butler concludes, "If the immutable character of sex is contested, perhaps this construct called 'sex' is as culturally constructed as gender; indeed, perhaps it was always already gender, with the consequence that the distinction between sex and gender turns out to be no distinction at all."

Institutional and governmental use 

Governments, corporations, and organizations have varying recognition of, and approaches to the distinction between sex and gender.

U.S. Census 

The United States Census Bureau performs a census of the U.S. population every ten years. The questionnaire asks one question about sex, phrased as "What is person 1's sex?" and provides two checkboxes for the response, labeled "Male" and "Female".  An explanatory page explains this question, using the term sex: as "We ask one question about a person's sex to better understand demographic characteristics." The U.S. Census has had a question about sex on the census since the 1790 census.  The U.S. Census recognizes the difference between the terms sex and gender, the fact they are often confused or used interchangeably, and may differ across cultures and time, and explains that what the census attempts to measure, is "the sex composition of the population".

Australian government 

The Australian government provides guidelines on sex and gender to the public based on legislation passed in 2013.  The guidelines recognize that "individuals may identify as a gender other than the sex they were assigned at birth, or may not identify as exclusively male or female". The Australian Bureau of Statistics (ABS) gathers data about the population broken down in various ways, including by sex and gender. They require precise formulations of these terms, and go into some detail about sex recorded at birth, possible changes in sex assignment later in life, the meaning of gender and how it differs from sex. ABS recognizes the popular confusion among the two terms, and provide descriptions of how to phrase surveys so as to elicit accurate responses for the purposes of the data they collect.

The government of the state of Western Australia recognizes a clear distinction between sex and gender providing a nuanced definition of each, including complications involved in sex beyond just sex assigned at birth, and the socially constructed nature of gender, including possible non-binary aspects.

United Kingdom government 

The United Kingdom Office for National Statistics (ONS) describes definitions provided by the UK government that make clear distinctions between the "biological aspects" of sex, "generally male or female", and "assigned at birth", while describing gender as a "social construction relating to behaviours and attributes based on labels of masculinity and femininity". Pilot plans for the 2021 Census for England and Wales would have allowed respondents to answer the sex question with reference to their gender identity, despite the addition of a separate new question on gender identity. Quantitative social scientists criticised the ONS's apparent confusion between the concepts of sex and gender identity. The matter was taken to Judicial Review by feminist group Fair Play for Women. The ONS argued that sex was an "umbrella concept", but this view was rejected by the presiding judge as unpersuasive. The guidance was changed so that sex was clearly indicated as legal sex rather than identity.

Health organizations 

The World Health Organization's defines gender as "socially constructed", and sex as characteristics that are "biologically determined", drawing a distinction between the sex categories of male and female, and the genders "girls and boys who grow into men and women".

Mental health associations 

The American Psychiatric Association (APA) in their Guide for Working With Transgender and Gender Nonconforming Patients (TGNC Guide) has guidance for psychiatrists about gender, sex, and orientation. The TGNC defines gender as comprising two components, that of gender identity and gender expression. They define sex in biological terms, as "anatomical, hormonal, or genetic", and mentions birth assignment of sex based on external genital appearance.

See also 
 Anti-gender movement
 Gender equality
 Gender polarization
 Sex differences in psychology
 Stereotyping
 Queer heterosexuality

References 

Conceptual distinctions
Feminist theory
.sex
Feminism and history
.gender
Social constructionism